Advanced Direct Connect for a computer network is a peer-to-peer file-sharing protocol. This page compares the features of a number of software implementations of the protocol.

Hub software

General 

.

Operating system support 

.

Interface and programming

Features 

.

Client software

General

Operating system support 
.

Interface and programming 

.

Features 

.

Other software

General 
.

Operating system support 

.

Interface and programming

Features 

.

References

File sharing software
ADC Software